BeBionic is a commercial prosthetic hand designed to enable amputees to perform everyday activities, such as eating, drinking, writing, typing, turning a key in a lock and picking up small objects. 

The first version of the bebionic hand was launched at the World Congress and Orthopädie & Reha-Technik, Trade Show, Leipzig, Germany, in May 2010.

Designed in the United Kingdom, the bebionic hand is manufactured by RSL Steeper and is available worldwide. Since February 2, 2017, BeBionic is owned by Ottobock.

Technical specification 
Dimensions:

There are two formats of the "Bebionic3": the first is called the "Large" and the second is the "Medium". You will find in the next Table some dimensions of the 2 different prostheses. 

Grips:

The "Bebionic3" hand allows its owner to have several different holds, (up to 14,) allowing the user to perform a much larger number of tasks. This large number of grips is achieved thanks to a thumb that can take 2 positions according to the user's needs: opposite and not opposite.

- The opposite is true when the thumb is in opposition with the fingers of the hand, allowing holds such as pinching for example.

- The non-opposed position corresponds to the moment when the thumb is parallel to the fingers of the hand, allowing holds such as pointing the finger.

On the back of the hand, there is a button that will allow the holder of the prosthesis to choose the grip he wants. In fact, this button offers the possibility to choose between 2 programs, the primary and the secondary. Each of these 2 programs allows 2 different types of sockets. To switch from one to the other, the user must apply an OPEN OPEN signal, i.e. he must send a signal so that the hand opens completely, followed by a release and then again a signal allowing the complete opening.

In total with the 2 thumb positions, we get to 2*2*2=8 different takes, each with a specific name:

- Tripod: This is possible when the thumb is in the opposite position. We then have the index and middle fingers in contact with the thumb. For the other 2 remaining fingers, they continue to close until they reach the palm of the hand and therefore feel a resistance. It is therefore a fairly common grip since it allows its user to hold all kinds of everyday objects such as a fork or a pen.

- Pinch: This also happens when the thumb is in the opposite position, but it is necessary for the thumb to be manually repositioned by a technician so that only the index finger meets the thumb when the hand is closed. Indeed, the thumb is equipped with an adjustment device that allows it to be repositioned according to the desired grips. The pivot is actually equipped with a screw that once slightly unscrewed allows a small movement of the thumb. Smaller objects, such as a coin, can then be handled.

bebionic 2.0 

In September 2011, the bebionic second-generation prosthetic hand saw improvements to speed, accuracy, grip and durability, later becoming available in different size options making this life-changing prosthetic available to a broader range of patients.  Since its Initial upgrade, patients fitted with the bebionic 2.0 have seen many notable improvements in the form of high-capacity 2200mAh split cell internal batteries for increased usage time, gains in natural range of motion, Increased accuracy in touch sensitivity sensors, and numerous software upgrades, All of which have played a major role in providing a higher quality of life for those that benefit from this technology.

Patients 

During 2008, Jonathan Metz, from West Hartford, Connecticut, got his arm wedged in his basement furnace. Trapped in his own basement for three days, he had no alternative to self-amputating his own arm. Since using the prosthetic hand, in 2010, his life has dramatically improved. 

In 2012, Kingston upon Hull man, Mike Swainger, was the first person to receive a bionic hand on the NHS.

In 2015, a 26-year-old London-based woman, Nicky Ashwell, who was born without a right hand, received Bebionic's prosthetic hand.

Margarita Gracheva, from the Moscow Serpukhov, had her hands cut off by her husband. After six months of rehabilitation, dozens of concerned viewers of the Program live with Andrey Malakhov of the Russia 1 TV channel helped get her a new prosthesis arm.

Pop culture 

In the world of science fiction, the bebionic hand has been compared to the artificial hands of fictional characters such as The Terminator and Luke Skywalker from Star Wars.

References

External links 
 Bebionic Website 

Prosthetics
Bionics